Johannes Hendrikus "Jan" Barnard (21 October 1929 – 21 October 2012) was a South African long-distance runner. He competed in the marathon at the 1956 Summer Olympics. He won a bronze medal in the marathon at the 1954 British Empire and Commonwealth Games and a silver medal in 1958.

References

External links
 

1929 births
2012 deaths
People from Lichtenburg
South African male long-distance runners
South African male marathon runners
Olympic athletes of South Africa
Athletes (track and field) at the 1954 British Empire and Commonwealth Games
Athletes (track and field) at the 1958 British Empire and Commonwealth Games
Athletes (track and field) at the 1956 Summer Olympics
Commonwealth Games silver medallists for South Africa
Commonwealth Games bronze medallists for South Africa
Commonwealth Games medallists in athletics
Afrikaner people
20th-century South African people
21st-century South African people
Medallists at the 1954 British Empire and Commonwealth Games
Medallists at the 1958 British Empire and Commonwealth Games